Betty Clawman is a fictional superhero and disembodied cosmic force in the DC Comics shared universe.  She first appeared in Millennium #2 (January 1988), and was created by Steve Englehart and Joe Staton.

The Millennium series was specifically written to introduce superheroes of color into the DC universe. Betty Clawman is an Australian aboriginal woman, and her teammates include Gloss (aka Xiang Po, from mainland China), Jet (aka Celia Windward, an Afro-Caribbean British citizen), Extraño (aka Gregorio de la Vega, from Peru) and Inuit mechanic Thomas Kalmaku.

Fictional character biography
Betty Clawman was a young Australian aboriginal girl from Uluru, who was selected by the Guardians of the Universe to take part in an experiment in human evolution, and to advance the human race. Clawman, along with the other nine "chosen", are taught about the nature of the cosmos and endowed with immortality and metahuman abilities. Clawman was given the power to enter and merge with the Dreamtime, gaining vast and ill-defined abilities. Together with Harbinger, seven of the chosen formed the superhero team New Guardians, and took it upon themselves to fight evil wherever it lurked on Earth.

Betty and the team show up in Teen Titans Spotlight #19.

Since the New Guardians' series ended Betty has enjoyed relative obscurity. The character again appeared one decade later in Wonder Woman #175 (2001), where all the female heroes of the DC Universe were brought together to combat Circe.  Betty's contribution to the battle remains vague.

Betty Clawman later appeared in the comic book series Doomsday Clock, a crossover between DC Comics and Watchmen which concludes the story established in story established in The New 52 and DC Rebirth. She appears in the sixth issue of the series, using the alias Dreamer, in which she joins the member of the Sleeping Soldiers, an Australian group of metahumans created as part of an international arms race, in which the governments of  various companies around the world recruit sanctioned teams of superheros and metahumans. Joining her in the group are Tasmanian Devil, Argonaut, Dark Ranger, and Umbaluru. The group is accused of using Clawman's Dreamtime powers to induce other word leaders to sleep, and confronting them in their dreams, though the Australian government denies this. Clawman also appears in the twelfth and final issue of the series, where she and the other members of the Sleeping Soldiers participate in a fight among metahumans from the various international factions.

Powers and abilities
Betty's abilities since entering Dreamtime are vast and unspecified. She appears to have a degree of cosmic awareness, as befitting an Earth Mother figure, and has some ability to influence dreams. On one occasion she "synced" with Tom Kalmaku and amplified his own, equally nebulous, ability to "bring out the best in people" in order to unleash the genetic potential of an enslaved race of cloned humans.

Betty appears as a big giant head.  It is unclear whether this manifestation is visible to all.

Reception
Writer and scholar Frederick Luis Aldama described Clawman as one of several superheroes of color that began to emerge in comic books in the 1980s and 1990s, and he described her character as "interestingly fleshed out". Luke Pearson of the Special Broadcasting Service noted Betty Clawman is one of several Aboriginal characters in comic books who was not originally written or drawn by Aboriginal authors or artists, but said she is among a handful of recent characters created with more care for Aboriginal origins and characteristics, expressing hope that this would lead to future characters written and drawn by Aboriginals themselves. Tyson Yunkaporta of The Guardian said the character of Betty Clawman made an impression when first launched, but was among a handful of Aboriginal characters who were eventually "neutralised, reconciled with the main protagonists and retired to obscurity". Tim Richards of The Sydney Morning Herald called Betty Clawman "the most obscure of the big comic book companies' Aboriginal heroes". Pop culture writer Valerie Estelle Frankel noted that Betty Clawman is part of a trend of female characters having telepathy, mind control, or telekinesis, which Frankel said is presented in comic books as a "specifically feminine power".

History professor Allan Austing and English professor Patrick Hamilton, both of Misericordia University, were critical of the portrayal of Betty Clawman and other members of the New Guardians, who they described as racial stereotypes rather than actual characters. Austin said he was "horrified" by the depiction, and said while the characters were an attempt to promote multiculturalism and the benefits of a more inclusive society, the way the characters were executed risked having the opposite effect. Betty Clawman and others from the New Guardians were made part of a course the two taught at Misericorida called "Race and Graphic Narrative in Post-War United States".

References

Australian superheroes
Characters created by Steve Englehart
Comics characters introduced in 1988
DC Comics female superheroes
DC Comics superheroes 
Fictional characters with dream manipulation abilities
DC Comics characters who have mental powers
Fictional empaths
Fictional indigenous people of Australia
DC Comics deities